The 2008–09 season of the female football Superliga Femenina started on 7 September 2008 and finished on 10 May 2009.

Rayo Vallecano won the league for the first time in its history.

Teams
CFF Puebla merged to Extremadura Femenino CF and was relocated to Almendralejo.

League table

Results

References

External links
Season on soccerway.com

2008-09
Spa
1
women